Thompson Lake is a lake in St. Louis County, in the U.S. state of Minnesota.

Thompson Lake bears the name of a lumberman who worked in the area.

See also
List of lakes in Minnesota

References

Lakes of Minnesota
Lakes of St. Louis County, Minnesota